Corymbia brachycarpa is a species of tree that is endemic to central Queensland. It has rough, tessellated bark on the trunk and branches, lance-shaped adult leaves, flower buds in groups of seven, creamy white flowers and urn-shaped to barrel-shaped fruit.

Description
It has rough, tessellated, brown to grey bark on the trunk and branches.

Taxonomy and naming
This eucalypt was first formally described in 1987 by Denis Carr and Stella Carr and was given the name Eucalyptus brachycarpa. In 1995 Ken Hill and Lawrie Johnson changed the name to Corymbia brachycarpa. The specific epithet (brachycarpa) is derived from ancient Greek words meaning "short" and "fruit".

Distribution and habitat
Corymbia brachycarpa mostly grows in deep sand with an understorey of Triodia, other trees and shrubs. It is found in central Queensland including in the White Mountains and south to near Barcaldine, Alpha and Blackall.

Conservation status
This eucalypt is listed as of "least concern" under the Queensland Government Nature Conservation Act 1992.

See also
 List of Corymbia species

References

brachycarpa
Myrtales of Australia
Flora of Queensland
Plants described in 1987
Taxa named by Maisie Carr